is a railway station on the Muroran Main Line in Yuni, Yūbari District, Hokkaido, Japan. The station is operated by Hokkaido Railway Company (JR Hokkaido).

Lines
Mikawa Station is served by the Muroran Main Line.

Station layout
The station has two ground-level side platforms serving two tracks. The Kitaca farecard cannot be used at this station. The station is unattended.

Platforms

Adjacent stations

See also
 List of railway stations in Japan

References

Railway stations in Hokkaido Prefecture
Stations of Hokkaido Railway Company
Railway stations in Japan opened in 1897